Jeff Stoutland (born February 10, 1962) is an American football coach who is the run game coordinator and offensive line coach for the Philadelphia Eagles of the National Football League (NFL). He served as the interim head football coach for the University of Miami in 2010.

Playing career
Stoutland was a four-year letterman and three-year starter at inside linebacker for head coach Kevin Gilbride at Southern Connecticut State, where he earned Little All-America honors as a senior while acting as team captain. He graduated in 1984 with a bachelor’s degree in physical education.

Coaching career

Early career
Stoutland begin his coaching career at his alma mater, Southern Connecticut State, and coached inside linebackers for two seasons. He then served as a graduate assistant for Dick MacPherson for two years at Syracuse. He then returned to Southern Connecticut where he served as offensive coordinator until 1992. Stoutland then coached the offensive line at Cornell and Syracuse, before moving to Michigan State from 2000 until 2006. During his tenure at Michigan State, Stoutland helped develop six All-Big Ten selections, and led the Big Ten in fewest sacks allowed.

Miami
Stoutland spent the four seasons at Miami as the offensive line coach. In 2010, the Hurricanes led the ACC in total offense and were third in rushing. On November 28, 2010, after Miami's head coach Randy Shannon was fired, Stoutland was named interim head coach for the team's bowl game. Miami lost 33-17 to Notre Dame in Stoutland's only game as coach.

Alabama
On January 14, 2011, Stoutland was named Alabama's offensive line coach, after Joe Pendry retired. During his brief tenure as OL coach at Alabama, the Crimson Tide won consecutive BCS national championships over the LSU Tigers (2011) and Notre Dame Fighting Irish (2012) respectively.

Philadelphia Eagles
On February 7, 2013, Stoutland was hired by the Philadelphia Eagles as the offensive line coach under head coach Chip Kelly. In 2016, Stoutland was retained under new Eagles head coach Doug Pederson. Stoutland won his first Super Bowl ring when the Eagles defeated the New England Patriots in Super Bowl LII. On March 7, 2018, Stoutland was given an additional role as run game coordinator. In 2021, Stoutland was retained under the Eagles new head coach Nick Sirianni.

Head coaching record

Notes

References

External links
 Philadelphia Eagles profile

1962 births
Living people
American football linebackers
Alabama Crimson Tide football coaches
Cornell Big Red football coaches
Miami Hurricanes football coaches
Michigan State Spartans football coaches
Philadelphia Eagles coaches
Southern Connecticut State Owls football coaches
Southern Connecticut State Owls football players
Syracuse Orange football coaches
Sportspeople from Staten Island
Players of American football from New York City
Coaches of American football from New York (state)